Seyyedabad (also Romanized as Seyyedābād, Saidābād, and Saiyidābād) is a village in Abarshiveh Rural District, in the Central District of Damavand County, Tehran Province, Iran. At the 2006 census, its population was 293, in 83 families.

References 

Populated places in Damavand County